Senara (Niangolo), one of a cluster of languages called Senari, is a Senufo language of Burkina Faso and Mali.

Writing System

References

Senari languages
Languages of Mali
Languages of Burkina Faso